Johnson Wax Headquarters is the world headquarters and administration building of S. C. Johnson & Son in Racine, Wisconsin. Designed by American architect Frank Lloyd Wright for the company's president, Herbert F. "Hib" Johnson, the building was constructed from 1936 to 1939. Its distinctive "lily pad" columns and other innovations revived Wright's career at a point when he was losing influence. Also known as the Johnson Wax Administration Building, it and the nearby 14-story Johnson Wax Research Tower (built 1944–1950) were designated as a National Historic Landmark in 1976 as Administration Building and Research Tower, S.C. Johnson and Son.

Design
The Johnson Wax Headquarters were in an industrial zone, and Wright decided to create a sealed environment lit from above, as he had done with the Larkin Administration Building. The building features Wright's interpretation of the streamlined Art Moderne style popular in the 1930s. In a break with his earlier Prairie School structures, the building features many curvilinear forms and required over 200 different curved "Cherokee red" bricks to create the sweeping curves of the interior and exterior. The mortar between the bricks is raked in traditional Wright style to accentuate the horizontality of the building. The warm, reddish hue of the bricks was used in the polished concrete floor slab as well; the white stone trim and white dendriform (tree-like) columns create a subtle yet striking contrast. All of the furniture, manufactured by Steelcase, was designed for the building by Wright and it echoed many of the building's design features.

The entrance is within the structure, penetrating the building on one side with a covered carport on the other. The carport is supported by short versions of the steel-reinforced dendriform concrete columns that appear in the Great Workroom. The low carport ceiling creates a compression of space that is released when entering the main building, where the dendriform columns rise over two stories tall; the interior space thus appears larger than it is. Compression and release of space were concepts that Wright used in many of his designs, including the playroom in his Oak Park Home and Studio, the Unity Temple in Oak Park, Illinois, the Solomon R. Guggenheim Museum in New York City, and many others.

Throughout the Great Workroom, which has no internal walls, the thin, white dendriform columns rise to circular "lily pad" tops that form the ceiling, with the spaces between the circles consisting of skylights made of Pyrex glass tubing. At the corners, where the walls usually meet the ceiling, the glass tubes continue up and over and connect to the skylights, creating a clerestory effect and admitting a soft light. The Great Workroom is the largest expanse of space in the building, and was intended for the secretaries of the Johnson Wax company, with a mezzanine for administrators.

Construction

In the Great Workroom, the columns expand from 9 inches (23 cm) in diameter at the bottom to "lily pads" 18 feet (5.5 m) in diameter at the top; skeptical building inspectors required that a test column be built and loaded with twelve tons of material. After the test column proved capable of supporting the specified load, Wright had the load progressively increased. Only at sixty tons load did any crack appear.

The building was completed in 1939, considerably over-budget. It proved very difficult to properly seal the glass tubing of the clerestories and roof, and leaks occurred. The problem was not solved until the company replaced the top layers of tubes with skylights consisting of angled sheets of fiberglass and specially molded sheets of Plexiglas with painted dark lines to resemble the original joints in a trompe-l'œil when viewed from the ground. 

Wright designed not only the building but its furniture. His chair design originally had only three legs, supposedly to encourage better posture (because one would have to keep both feet on the ground at all times to sit in it). However, the chair proved unstable, tipping very easily. Purportedly, Wright redesigned the chairs after Herbert Johnson asked him to sit in one, and he fell out of it. Johnson Wax has continued to use Wright's furniture.

Despite these problems, Johnson was pleased with the building and later commissioned the Research Tower and a house (known as Wingspread) from Wright.

Research Tower
The Research Tower was added in 1950 to the Administration Building, and provides a vertical counterpoint to its horizontality. It is one of only two existing high-rise buildings by Wright.  Cantilevered from a giant stack, the tower's floor slabs spread out like tree branches, providing for vertical segmentation of departments. Elevator and stairway channels run up the reinforced concrete core, which Wright called a tap root. This single core was based on an idea that he had proposed in 1929 for the St. Mark's Tower, and which he used again in 1952 in the Price Tower in Bartlesville, Oklahoma. Freed from peripheral supporting elements, the tower rises from a garden and three fountain pools that surround its base while a court on three sides provides parking for employees.

The Research Tower was taken out of use in 1980 because it no longer met fire safety codes; it only has a single 29-inch wide twisting staircase, and originally had no sprinklers because Wright thought them ugly. SC Johnson considered proposals to retrofit the tower to meet these codes, including one submitted by apprentices from Taliesin, but all were ultimately rejected out of concern it would mar the appearance of the tower. The company is committed to preserving it as a symbol of its history. In 2013, an extensive 12-month restoration was completed. The tower was relit on December 21, 2013, to mark the winter solstice, and S.C. Johnson & Son announced that it would be opened for public tours for the first time in its history. The research labs shown on the tour have been set up to appear frozen in time, including beakers, scales, centrifuges, archival photographs and letters about the building.

Legacy
The Johnson Wax buildings are on the National Register of Historic Places, and the Administration Building and the Research Tower were chosen by the American Institute of Architects as two of seventeen buildings by the architect to be retained as examples of his contribution to American culture. In addition, in 1974 the Administration Building was awarded a Twenty-Five Year Award by the American Institute of Architects and in 1976, both were designated National Historic Landmarks.

See also
List of National Historic Landmarks in Wisconsin
National Register of Historic Places in Racine County, Wisconsin

References

Literature
 Lipman, Jonathon: Frank Lloyd Wright and the Johnson Wax Building. New York. Rizzoli. 1986.
 Storrer, William Allin: The Frank Lloyd Wright Companion. University Of Chicago Press, 2006.

External links

SC Johnson architecture page includes links to tour information for the Johnson Wax building.
Johnson Wax Building, is a page from an independent website, Frank Lloyd Wright Roadtrip concentrating on the architecture of Frank Lloyd Wright. Includes photographs.
Johnson Wax Building at Great Buildings Online

Frank Lloyd Wright buildings
National Historic Landmarks in Wisconsin
Office buildings completed in 1939
S. C. Johnson & Son
Buildings and structures in Racine, Wisconsin
Commercial buildings on the National Register of Historic Places in Wisconsin
Tourist attractions in Racine, Wisconsin
National Register of Historic Places in Racine County, Wisconsin
Office buildings in Wisconsin
Headquarters in the United States
1939 establishments in Wisconsin